Subspace may refer to:

In mathematics
 A space inheriting all characteristics of a parent space
 A subset of a topological space endowed with the subspace topology
 Linear subspace, in linear algebra, a subset of a vector space that is closed under addition and scalar multiplication
 Flat (geometry), a Euclidean subspace
 Affine subspace, a geometric structure that generalizes the affine properties of a flat
 Projective subspace, a geometric structure that generalizes a linear subspace of a vector space
 Multilinear subspace in multilinear algebra, a subset of a tensor space that is closed under addition and scalar multiplication

In science fiction
 a concept similar to that of hyperspace
 Subspace (Star Trek), a fictional feature of space-time that facilitates faster-than-light communication and transit

In games
 SubSpace (video game), a two-dimensional space shooter computer game
 The Subspace Emissary, the Adventure mode in the video game Super Smash Bros. Brawl

Other uses
 "Subspace" (song), a 2001 single by Funker Vogt
 Subspace, in BDSM, a psychological state that can be entered by the submissive participant